Kowloon -Nine Heads Rodeo Show- (九龍-Nine Heads Rodeo Show-) is the fifth maxi single by Japanese band Alice Nine. It was released on January 25, 2006. The single was released in two versions: the limited edition of the single includes a DVD containing the music video for the title track, and the regular edition includes a bonus track.

The title track was later released on the band's first album, Zekkeishoku.

It is one of the band's most popular live tracks and has been played on every tour since the release of Zekkeishoku

Track listing

Version 1 (CD and DVD)
 "Kowloon -Nine Heads Rodeo Show-" (九龍-Nine Heads Rodeo Show-)
 "Red Carpet Going On"
 "Kowloon -Nine Heads Rodeo Show-" music video (九龍-Nine Heads Rodeo Show-)

Version 2 (CD only)
 "Kowloon -Nine Heads Rodeo Show-" (九龍-Nine Heads Rodeo Show-)
 "Red Carpet Going On"
 "Senjō ni Hanataba wo" (戦場に花束を; In a Battlefield with a Bouquet)

External links
 PS Company Official Website
 King Records' Official Website

2006 singles
Alice Nine songs
2006 songs